Modigliani is a Jewish Italian surname, which may refer to:

People
Amedeo Modigliani (1884–1920), painter and sculptor
Elio Modigliani (1860–1932), anthropologist, zoologist, and plant collector
Ettore Modigliani (1873–1947), Italian functionary
Franco Modigliani (1918–2003), economist
Jeanne Modigliani (1918–1984), daughter and biographer of Amedeo Modigliani

Other uses
Modigliani (film), a 2004 biographical film about Amedeo Modigliani
"Modigliani (Lost In Your Eyes)", a 1987 single from the band Book of Love

See also
Modigliani–Miller theorem, an influential element of economic theory
Modigliani risk-adjusted performance, a measure of risk-adjusted performance in economics

Surnames of Italian origin
Jewish surnames